The Leeds cross is a collection of fragments of probably tenth-century stone sculpture that has been reassembled into a cross. The fragments were found in the fabric of Leeds Minster when the tower of the old church was demolished in 1838. The architect, Robert Chantrell noticed a collection of carved stones built into the medieval architecture, some of them forming the cross. Representations of the Four Evangelists appear between distinctive interlaced decoration dating to the 10th or 11th centuries. The cross currently stands within the church and is an important example of Anglo-Saxon sculpture. It is also the most complete example of a number of depictions of the legendary smith Weland and Beaduhild, the mother of his child, from tenth-century Yorkshire.

References

External links

 Entry in the online Corpus of Anglo-Saxon Stone Sculpture

Anglo-Saxon art
Christianity in Anglo-Saxon England
High crosses in England
Norse mythology